Mayoral elections were held on Pitcairn Island on 9 November 2022. The result was a victory for Simon Young, who became the island's first non-native leader. He defeated a challenger by 19 votes to 16.

Results

Aftermath
Young took office on 1 January 2023. A by-election took place on 20 January to elect his replacement on the Island Council.

References

Pitcairn
2022 in the Pitcairn Islands
Mayor
Election and referendum articles with incomplete results